Dorota Bidołach (born 22 June 1957) is a Polish sports shooter. She competed in two events at the 1988 Summer Olympics.

References

1957 births
Living people
Polish female sport shooters
Olympic shooters of Poland
Shooters at the 1988 Summer Olympics
People from Zielona Góra